J.D. Williams (born June 3, 1942) was a prominent state politician in Idaho. He was the only Democrat to win a statewide election in 1994.

See also
Politics of Idaho

References

External links
NASACT Bio

Idaho Democrats
Idaho State Controllers
Place of birth missing (living people)
Living people
1942 births